Xu Shilin (born 10 January 1998) is a Chinese tennis player.

Xu was born in Zhongshan, and has won five singles and six doubles titles on the ITF Women's Circuit. On 6 May 2019, she reached her best singles ranking of world No. 190. On 22 August 2016, she peaked at No. 127 in the WTA doubles rankings.

Career

2013
Partnering Sun Ziyue, Xu won her first $50k tournament at Sanya, defeating Yang Zhaoxuan and Zhao Yijing in the 2013 final.

2014
At the Shenzhen Open, Xu made her WTA Tour debut. Having been given a wild card into qualifying for the singles main draw, she was drawn against Britain's Johanna Konta. Despite a difference of over 500 places in the world rankings, Xu won in straight sets, but lost to Lyudmyla Kichenok in the final round. Partnering Sun Ziyue again in doubles at the tournament, Xu was given a wild card into the main draw, but couldn't make it past her fellow Chinese pairing of Wang Yafan and Zheng Jie, who later made it to the semifinals.

At the 2014 Summer Youth Olympics in Nanjing, Xu won the gold medal in girls' singles, having defeated Iryna Shymanovich of Belarus in straight sets in the final.

WTA career finals

Doubles: 1 (runner–up)

ITF Circuit finals

Singles: 7 (5 titles, 2 runner–ups)

Doubles: 11 (6 titles, 5 runner–ups)

References

External links
 
 

1998 births
Living people
People from Zhongshan
Chinese female tennis players
Tennis players at the 2014 Summer Youth Olympics
Youth Olympic gold medalists for China
Tennis players from Guangdong
21st-century Chinese women